Dr. Moreau's House of Pain is a 2004 film directed by Charles Band.

Plot
A group of friends investigate various strange events and find themselves trapped in a house at the mercy of a strange doctor and his various hideous "creations".

References

External links
 

2004 horror films
American science fiction horror films
Films directed by Charles Band
Films based on works by H. G. Wells
The Island of Doctor Moreau
2004 films
2000s science fiction horror films
Mad scientist films
2000s English-language films
2000s American films